Tripping the Live Fantastic is Paul McCartney's first official solo live album and his first release of concert material since Wings' 1976 Wings over America live package. It was released in 1990 as triple LP, double cassette and double CD. Tripping the Live Fantastic reached number 17 in the UK and number 26 in the US. It was also simultaneously released in an abridged form, entitled Tripping the Live Fantastic: Highlights!

History
A document of the highly successful The Paul McCartney World Tour, Tripping the Live Fantastic encompasses McCartney's entire musical career from his Beatles hits to his recent hit album, Flowers in the Dirt, while also including some unique covers. Interspersed throughout are occasional soundcheck recordings as well. The title is an allusion to the phrase "tripping the light fantastic", meaning to dance or move to musical accompaniment, originally from the poem L'Allegro by John Milton. Although he had reversed the Lennon–McCartney credits on Wings over America in 1976, McCartney left the credits for his Beatles songs on Tripping the Live Fantastic in their original form.

Tripping the Live Fantastic: Highlights!
Tripping the Live Fantastic: Highlights! is an abridged version of the double CD/triple LP Tripping the Live Fantastic.  Released in 1990, it documents the highly successful Paul McCartney World Tour of 1989–1990.

Cutting out soundcheck recordings and leaving concert highlights (hence, the album's title), this set is notable for the exclusive inclusion of "All My Trials", not found on the more complete Tripping the Live Fantastic double CD set or on the US commercial release version, where it was replaced by "Put It There", but it was issued on the Columbia House mail-order Highlights release.

Not charting at all in the UK, Tripping the Live Fantastic: Highlights! reached number 141 in the US on the Billboard 200 and, proving to be a sustained seller, went platinum. The original set peaked at number 26 and failed to go gold.

Get Back
A VHS concert film was also released, entitled Get Back. The film was directed by Richard Lester.

Paul McCartney: Going Home
The Disney Channel filmed Paul McCartney: Going Home during this period.  The show highlights McCartney's return to Liverpool where he introduced a tribute to John Lennon, featured on the B-side of the "All My Trials" single, comprising "Strawberry Fields Forever", "Help!" and "Give Peace a Chance".

Paul McCartney: Put It There
Another VHS film was released, titled Paul McCartney: Put It There. The film featured McCartney and his band rehearsing for the tour.

Track listing
All songs by Paul McCartney, except where noted.

Tripping the Live Fantastic

Tripping the Live Fantastic: Highlights!

Personnel
Paul McCartney – lead vocals, acoustic, electric and bass guitars, piano, keyboards
Linda McCartney – keyboards, backing vocals
Hamish Stuart – acoustic, electric and bass guitars, backing vocals, lead vocals on "Ebony and Ivory"
Robbie McIntosh – electric guitars, backing vocals
Paul 'Wix' Wickens – keyboards, backing vocals
Chris Whitten – drums, percussion

Charts

Weekly charts

Tripping the Live Fantastic

Tripping the Live Fantastic – Highlights!

Certifications

Tripping the Live Fantastic

Tripping the Live Fantastic – Highlights!

References

Albums produced by Paul McCartney
Albums produced by Bob Clearmountain
Paul McCartney live albums
1990 live albums
Parlophone live albums